Pascale Arbillot (born 17 April 1970) is a French actress. She is a graduate of the Paris Institute of Political Sciences; however, soon after, she decided to become an actress. She has appeared in films, on television and in the theatre.

Filmography
{| class="wikitable sortable"
|-
! Year
! Title
! Role
! Director
! class="unsortable" | Notes
|-
| 1993
| Le miel et les abeilles
| The lawyer
| Christophe Gregeois
| TV Series (1 Episode)
|-
| rowspan=3| 1994
| L'affaire
| The secretary
| Sergio Gobbi
| 
|-
| Le cri coupé
| Thérèse Troppmann
| Miguel Courtois
| TV Movie
|-
| La rêverie ou le mariage de Sylvia
| Emilie
| Jean-Luc Trotignon
| TV Movie
|-
| rowspan=3| 1995
| Lettre ouverte à Lili
| Employee taxes
| Jean-Luc Trotignon
| TV Movie
|-
| Nestor Burma
| Lorraine
| Daniel Losset
| TV Series (1 Episode)
|-
| Julie Lescaut
| Martine
| Élisabeth Rappeneau & Marion Sarraut
| TV Series (2 Episodes)
|-
| 1995-97
| Les Cordier, juge et flic
| Hannah / Sonia
| Jacques Cortal & Marion Sarraut
| TV Series (2 Episodes)
|-
| 1996
| L'homme idéal
| The woman
| François Ozon
| Short
|-
| rowspan=7| 1997
| Mon jour de chance
| The woman
| Pascale Pouzadoux
| Short
|-
| Les voisins
| Madame Mercier
| Artus de Penguern
| Short
|-
| Rien que des grandes personnes
| 
| Jean-Marc Brondolo
| Short
|-
| Féminin masculine
| Delphine
| Michaëla Watteaux
| TV Movie
|-
| Salut l'angoisse
| Laura
| Maurice Frydland
| TV Movie
|-
| Bonne fête papa
| Lucy
| Didier Fontan
| TV Movie
|-
| Navarro
| Anne-Lise Bellec
| José Pinheiro
| TV Series (1 Episode)
|-
| rowspan=4| 1998
| Double jeu
| Rosa
| Emmanuel Oberg
| Short
|-
| La polyclinique de l'amour
| Priscilla
| Artus de Penguern
| Short
|-
| Une grosse bouchée d'amour
| Agnès
| Michaëla Watteaux
| TV Movie
|-
| Vertiges
| Jeanne
| Eric Woreth
| TV Series (1 Episode)
|-
| 1998-2003
| Crimes en série
| Maud Berthier
| Patrick Dewolf, Pascal Légitimus, ...
| TV Series (10 Episodes)
|-
| rowspan=4| 1999
| One 4 All
| The businesswoman
| Claude Lelouch
| 
|-
| Le sourire du clown
| Hélène
| Éric Besnard
| 
|-
| Si les poules avaient des dents
| The farmer
| Pierre Dugowson
| Short
|-
| Quand fond la neige où va le blanc?
| The woman
| Jean-Michel Aubret
| Short
|-
| 2000
| L'extraterrestre
| Agathe
| Didier Bourdon
| 
|-
| rowspan=5| 2001
| Gregoire Moulin vs. Humanity
| Odile Bonheur
| Artus de Penguern
| 
|-
| La tortue
| Valérie Gaspari
| Dominique Baron
| TV Movie
|-
| Les ex font la loi
| Clémence
| Philippe Triboit
| TV Movie
|-
| Juliette: Service(s) compris
| Mathilde
| Jérôme Foulon
| TV Movie
|-
| Docteur Sylvestre
| Charlotte
| Marion Sarraut
| TV Series (1 Episode)
|-
| rowspan=3| 2002
| Plus haut
| Claire
| Nicolas Brevière
| 
|-
| Le grand soir
| Hélène Raymond
| Stéphane Brisset
| Short
|-
| Vu à la télé
| Cécile
| Daniel Losset
| TV Movie
|-
| rowspan=6| 2003
| Toutes les filles sont folles
| The judge
| Pascale Pouzadoux
| 
|-
| Changer tout
| Florence
| Élisabeth Rappeneau
| TV Movie
|-
| Une amie en or
| Julie Ferenzi
| Eric Woreth
| TV Movie
|-
| Mon voisin du dessus
| Odile
| Laurence Katrian
| TV Movie
|-
| La maîtresse du corroyeur
| Simone Porquel
| Claude Grinberg
| TV Movie
|-
| Mata Hari, la vraie histoire
| France Bouchardon
| Alain Tasma
| TV Movie
|-
| rowspan=7| 2004
| Clara et moi
| Isabelle
| Arnaud Viard
| 
|-
| (Mon) Jour de chance
| 
| Nicolas Brevière
| Short
|-
| Les robinsonnes
| Nadia
| Laurent Dussaux
| TV Movie
|-
| Caution personnelle
| Solange
| Serge Meynard
| TV Movie
|-
| La tresse d'Aminata
| Gaëlle
| Dominique Baron
| TV Movie
|-
| Maigret
| Gisèle Marton
| Pierre Joassin
| TV Series (1 Episode)
|-
| La crim'''
| Mélanie
| Dominique Guillo
| TV Series (1 Episode)
|-
| rowspan=3| 2005
| Edy| Catherine
| Stéphan Guérin-Tillié
| 
|-
| Espace détente| Véro Convenant
| Yvan Le Bolloc'h & Bruno Solo
| 
|-
| Les couilles de mon chat| Marie
| Didier Bénureau
| Short
|-
| 2005-08
| Merci, les enfants vont bien !| Isabelle
| Stéphane Clavier
| TV Series (12 Episodes)
|-
| rowspan=4| 2006
| Hell| The gynecologist
| Bruno Chiche
| 
|-
| Un printemps à Paris| Louise
| Jacques Bral
| 
|-
| Une histoire de pieds| Judith
| Stéphane & David Foenkinos
| Short
|-
| Mer belle à agitée| Sabine Bertignac
| Pascal Chaumeil
| TV Movie
|-
| 2007
| Cut !| The woman
| Alain Riou
| Short
|-
| rowspan=2| 2008
| Notre univers impitoyable| Juliette
| Léa Fazer
| Alpe d'Huez International Comedy Film Festival - Best Acting
|-
| Let's Talk About the Rain| Florence
| Agnès Jaoui
| Prix Raimu - Best Supporting Actress
|-
| rowspan=2| 2009
| Coco| Agathe
| Gad Elmaleh
| 
|-
| Divorces !| Valentine
| Valérie Guignabodet
| 
|-
| rowspan=4| 2010
| Little White Lies| Isabelle Ribaud
| Guillaume Canet
| 
|-
| Small World| Doctor Wirth
| Bruno Chiche
| 
|-
| Les meilleurs amis du monde| Lucie
| Julien Rambaldi
| 
|-
| Un soupçon d'innocence| Marie
| Olivier Péray
| TV MovieFestival de la fiction TV de La Rochelle - Best Actress
|-
| rowspan=3| 2011
| The Art of Love| Zoé
| Emmanuel Mouret
| 
|-
| All Our Desires| Marthe
| Philippe Lioret
| 
|-
| Une pure affaire| Christine Pelame
| Alexandre Coffre
| Alpe d'Huez International Comedy Film Festival - Best Acting
|-
| rowspan=2| 2012
| Bankable| Barbara Deville
| Mona Achache
| TV MovieLuchon International Film Festival - Best Actress
|-
| Les pirogues des hautes terres| Yvonne Hauterive
| Olivier Langlois
| TV Movie 
|-
| 2013
| Des frères et des soeurs| Adèle
| Anne Giafferi
| TV Movie
|-
| rowspan=5| 2014
| Gemma Bovery| The new neighbor
| Anne Fontaine
| 
|-
| Papa Was Not a Rolling Stone| The counselor
| Sylvie Ohayon
| 
|-
| Palais de justesse| The assessor
| Stéphane De Groodt
| Short
|-
| La vie à l'envers| Odile
| Anne Giafferi
| TV Movie
|-
| Resistance| Victoria
| Miguel Courtois & David Delrieux
| TV Mini-Series
|-
| rowspan=3| 2015
| French Cuisine| Charlotte
| Florent Emilio Siri
| 
|-
| Stunned| Madame Coppi
| Gérard Pautonnier
| Short
|-
| Marjorie| Louise
| Mona Achache
| TV Series (1 Episode)
|-
| rowspan=3| 2016
| La folle histoire de Max et Léon| The actress
| Jonathan Barré
| 
|-
| Juillet août| Anne Bruant
| Diastème
| 
|-
| Accusé| Danielle
| Mona Achache
| TV Series (1 Episode)
|-
| rowspan=6| 2017
| I Got Life!| Mano
| Blandine Lenoir
| 
|-
| Maryline| Betty Brant
| Guillaume Gallienne
| 
|-
| Momo| Sarah
| Vincent Lobelle & Sébastien Thiery
| 
|-
| Heurts| Lisa
| Sophie Guillemin
| Short
|-
| Le ticket| Agnès
| Ali Marhyar
| Short
|-
| Jusqu'à écoulement des stocks| 
| Pierre Dugowson
| Short
|-
| rowspan=4| 2018
| Guy| Sophie Ravel
| Alex Lutz
| 
|-
| La Fête des mères| Isabelle
| Marie-Castille Mention-Schaar
| 
|-
| Pauvre Georges !| Lila Maurin
| Claire Devers
| 
|-
| Genius| Emilie-Marguerite Walter
| Mathias Herndl
| TV Series (1 Episode)
|-
| rowspan=4| 2019
| Nous finirons ensemble| Isabelle
| Guillaume Canet
| 
|-
| Miss| Amanda
| Ruben Alves
| 
|-
| Mon chien stupide| 
| Yvan Attal
| 
|-
| Le meilleur reste à venir| 
| Alexandre de La Patellière & Matthieu Delaporte
| 
|-
| rowspan=2| 2020
| Lost Bullet| Moss
| Guillaume Pierret
|
|-
| Mon Cousin| 
| Jan Kounen
| 
|-
| 2022
| Lost Bullet 2| Moss
| Guillaume Pierret
|
|}

Theater

Personal life
She was in couple with the actor Artus de Penguern from 1996 to 2004. From 2005 to 2010, She was in a relationship with Bruno Chiche'', they had a son together, Léonard, born in 2005.

References

External links

 

French stage actresses
Living people
French film actresses
French television actresses
1970 births
Sciences Po alumni
20th-century French actresses
21st-century French actresses